The 2018 Dubai Women's Sevens was the second tournament within the 2018–19 World Rugby Women's Sevens Series. It was held on 29–30 November 2018 at The Sevens Stadium in Dubai, United Arab Emirates.

Format
The teams are drawn into three pools of four teams each. Each team plays every other team in their pool once. The top two teams from each pool advance to the Cup/Plate brackets while the top 2 third place teams also compete in the Cup/Plate. The other teams from each group play-off for the Challenge Trophy.

Teams
Eleven core teams are participating in the tournament along with one invited team, 2018 Africa Women's Sevens winners Kenya:

Pool stage
All times in UAE Standard Time (UTC+4:00)

Pool A

Pool B

Pool C

Knockout stage

Challenge Trophy

Fifth place

Cup

Tournament placings

Source: World Rugby

Players

Scoring leaders

Source: World Rugby

See also
 World Rugby Women's Sevens Series
 2018–19 World Rugby Women's Sevens Series
 World Rugby

References

External links 
 Tournament site
 World Rugby info

2018-19
2018–19 World Rugby Women's Sevens Series
rugby union
2018 in women's rugby union
2018 rugby sevens competitions
2018 in Asian rugby union
Dubai Women's Sevens